Patshaling Gewog (Dzongkha: པ་ཚ་གླིང་) is a gewog (village block) of Tsirang District, Bhutan. It was formerly called Patale.

References

Gewogs of Bhutan
Tsirang District